Gulara Aliyeva (17 November 1933 – 27 July 1991) was an Azerbaijani musician.

Life 
Gulara Aziz gyzy Aliyeva (Gulara Aliyeva, daughter of Aziz, according to Azerbaijani name-surname convention) was born on 17 November 1933 in Baku, in the family of Aziz Aliyev and Leyli Aliyeva. She got her bachelor music degree at Azerbaijan State Conservatory (now Baku Music Academy). Having graduated in 1955, Gulara started her music career at Folk instruments Ensemble named after Said Rustamov, she also began working at Folk Instruments Ensemble after Ahsan Dadashov. In 1966 she created her own instrumental ensemble and called it "Dan ulduzu" which means "Dawn star". She played piano and directed this ensemble for many years.

References

Musicians from Baku
1933 births
1991 deaths
20th-century Azerbaijani musicians